Rank insignia in the French Air and Space Force are worn on the sleeve or on shoulder marks of uniforms

Officers
Although they all wear the same insignia and titles, officers are divided into:
Regular officers of the air force
Officers of the Armed Forces Commisariat Corps
Officers of the technical and administrative corps of the armed forces

- general officers

- senior officers

- junior officers

- sub-officers, i.e. non-commissioned officers

Full  are experienced junior officers, served by sergeants when commanding their unit.

A four chevron  rank existed until 1947. It was a ceremonial rank usually given to the most senior or experienced NCO in a unit, similar to a colour sergeant in the British Army. It was discontinued in the post-war army due to its redundancy.

- Troop ranks

There are also distinctions to distinguish volunteers and conscripts, and bars for experience (one for five years, up to four can be obtained).

Military chaplains

See also 
 French Air Force

References

 Official website
 Uniforminsignia.org (French Air Force)

French Air Force Ranks
Military ranks of France
French Air Force Ranks